Citizens Signpost Service is a body of the European Commission that assists European citizens to assert their European Union rights. The service is free of charge, and queries are answered by legal experts in the citizens' own language. Citizens are advised on ways of obtaining solutions to their problems, or referred to the Solvit network for effective problem-solving.

External links

The European Commission: http://ec.europa.eu/citizensrights/front_end/about/index_en.htm

European Commission